The Canadian Screen Award for Best Children's or Youth Fiction Program or Series is an annual television award, presented by the Academy of Canadian Cinema and Television to honour the year's best scripted children's television programming produced in Canada.

The award was first presented in 2002 as part of the Gemini Awards program. Prior to 2002, a single Gemini Award for Best Children's or Youth Program or Series was presented, inclusive of both fiction and non-fiction programming; in 2002, the award was split into separate categories for fiction and non-fiction programming.

Since 2013, the award has been presented as part of the Canadian Screen Awards.

Winners and nominees
Due to the distinction between the former Gemini Awards, which were usually presented in the late fall of the same year that the awards were presented for, and the current Canadian Screen Awards, which are presented early in the following year, awards are listed below under the year of eligibility rather than the year of presentation.

2000s

2002
  The Famous Jett Jackson
 Big Wolf on Campus
 Incredible Story Studio
 Mentors
 Our Hero

2003
  Degrassi: The Next Generation
 Fast Food High
 Guinevere Jones
 Moville Mysteries
 The Dinosaur Hunter

2004
  Degrassi: The Next Generation
 Edgemont
 Jacob Two-Two
 Radio Free Roscoe
 Strange Days at Blake Holsey High

2005
  Radio Free Roscoe
 15/Love
 Fries With That?
 Fungus the Bogeyman
 Instant Star

2006
  The Morgan Waters Show
 15/Love
 Dark Oracle
 renegadepress.com
 The Reading Rangers

2007
  Wapos Bay: The Series
 Alice, I Think
 Degrassi: The Next Generation
 Jacob Two-Two
 Spirit Bear: The Simon Jackson Story

2008
  Degrassi: The Next Generation
 Instant Star
 Tumbletown Tales

2009
  Life with Derek
 Instant Star
 The Latest Buzz

2010s

2010
  Overruled!
 Degrassi: The Next Generation
 Pillars of Freedom
 That's So Weird!
 Total Drama Action

2011
  Degrassi
 Anash and the Legacy of the Sun-Rock
 How to be Indie
 That's So Weird!
 Vacation with Derek

2012
  Degrassi
 The Haunting Hour
 Mudpit
 That's So Weird!
 What's Up Warthogs!

2013
  Degrassi
 ALIVE
 Life with Boys
 Mr. Young
 The Next Step

2014
  Degrassi
 The Next Step
 Total Drama All-Stars

2015
  Degrassi
 Annedroids
 Full Out
 Max & Shred

2016
  Odd Squad
 Backstage
 Degrassi: Next Class
 Make It Pop
 Wild Kratts

2017
 Odd Squad
Degrassi: Next Class
L.M. Montgomery's Anne of Green Gables: Fire and Dew
The Next Step

2018
 Odd Squad
Backstage
The Next Step
ReBoot: The Guardian Code

2019
 Holly Hobbie
Backstage
Big Top Academy
Creeped Out

2020
 Odd Squad Mobile Unit
Detention Adventure
Endlings
Holly Hobbie
Utopia Falls

2021
 The Hardy Boys
Endlings
Lockdown
Odd Squad Mobile Unit

2022
Detention Adventure
Holly Hobbie
Malory Towers
The Next Step
Odd Squad Mobile Unit

References

Children's fiction